The 1971 Indian general election in Odisha were held for 20 seats with the state going to the polls in the first two phases of the general elections.

The major contenders in the state were the Indian National Congress and the Swatantra Party. The third front parties contesting in the state were the Utkal Congress, the Left parties. The assembly elections were held simultaneously with the general elections in the state.

Biju Patnaik was close to Indira Gandhi. However, they clashed in 1969 over the Presidential election. He left the Congress and formed a regional party called Utkal Congress.

Voting and results
Source: Election Commission of India

List of elected MPs
Keys:

Bye Elections

References

Indian general elections in Odisha
Odisha
Odisha-related lists
1970s in Orissa